Jennifer Greenburg (born 1977) is an American photographer. Greenburg is known in particular for her series Revising History where she uses digital technology to insert herself into historical photographs.

Her work is included in the permanent collections of the Museum of Fine Arts, Houston, and the Museum of Contemporary Photography,

References

1977 births
20th-century American women artists
21st-century American women artists
20th-century American photographers
21st-century American photographers
Living people